Phantom II may refer to:

 F-4 Phantom II, a U.S. fighter aircraft, introduced into service in 1960
 Phantom X1 or Phantom II, an ultralight trainer produced by Phantom Aeronautics
 Rolls-Royce Phantom II, a British luxury automobile manufactured by Rolls-Royce from 1929 to 1936
 Phantom 2, a model of the Phantom drone made by DJI

See also 
 Phantom (disambiguation)